At the 1928 Winter Olympics, four Nordic skiing events were contested – two cross-country skiing events, one ski jumping event, and one Nordic combined event, all for men only.

1928 Winter Olympics events
1928